Dětřichov may refer to places in the Czech Republic:

Dětřichov (Liberec District), a municipality and village in the Liberec Region
Dětřichov (Svitavy District), a municipality and village in the Pardubice Region
Dětřichov nad Bystřicí, a municipality and village in the Moravian-Silesian Region
Dětřichov u Moravské Třebové, a municipality and village in the Pardubice Region
Dětřichov, a village and part of Jeseník in the Olomouc Region
Dětřichov, a village and part of Uničov in the Olomouc Region